Worsham High School, also known as Worsham Elementary and High School and Worsham School, is a historic high school complex located near Farmville, Prince Edward County, Virginia. It was built in 1927, and is a one- to two-story, banked brick building with a recessed, arched entrance showing influences from the Colonial Revival style. The school contains 12 classrooms on two floors arranged in a "U" around a central auditorium/classroom.  Also on the property are the contributing agriculture building and cannery, both rectangular cinder block buildings built about 1927.  In 1963–1964, the Worsham School was one of four County schools leased by the Prince Edward Free School system, a privately organized but federally supported organization providing free schooling for the African-American students of
Prince Edward County.

It was listed on the National Register of Historic Places in 2010.

References

African-American history of Virginia
School buildings on the National Register of Historic Places in Virginia
School buildings completed in 1927
Colonial Revival architecture in Virginia
Buildings and structures in Prince Edward County, Virginia
National Register of Historic Places in Prince Edward County, Virginia
1927 establishments in Virginia